Vinland Saga is the second full-length album by the symphonic metal band Leaves' Eyes, released in 2005. It is a concept album that tells the story of the voyage of the Norse explorer Leif Erikson and his discovery of Vinland (a.k.a. Newfoundland). The main vocals are by the Norwegian singer Liv Kristine, but some harsh vocals performed by her husband and producer Alexander Krull can be heard on the songs "Solemn Sea", "The Thorn", and "New Found Land".

A limited edition version of the album was released on 7 November 2006, which included two bonus tracks, a making-of video, an interview with Liv Kristine, as well as the music video produced for the single "Elegy" .

Track listing

Personnel

Leaves' Eyes
Liv Kristine Espenæs - lead vocals, keyboards
Alexander Krull - death grunts, keyboards, programming, samples
Thorsten Bauer - guitars, keyboards
Mathias Röderer - guitars, keyboards
Christopher Lukhaup - bass, keyboards
Moritz Neuner - drums, percussion, keyboards

Additional musicians
Robert & Johannes Suß, Norman Sickinger, Christof Kutzers, Anders Oddsberg, Steven Willems, Simone Sacco, Gunnar Sauermann, Sascha Henneberger, Markus Bruder, Jochen Steinsdorfer, Ralf Oechsle - backing vocals on "New Found Land"
Timon Birkhofer - cello and piano on "Elegy", harp on "Amhran" 
Jana Kallenberg - violin

Production
Produced, engineered, mixed and mastered by Alexander Krull at Mastersound Studios
Assistant recording engineers: Mathias Röderer, Thorsten Bauer, Chris Lukhaup, Robert Suß

Charts

Album

References

2005 albums
Leaves' Eyes albums
Concept albums
Napalm Records albums
Vinland
Albums produced by Alexander Krull
Cultural depictions of Leif Erikson